Army of the East may refer to:

 Armée de l'Est, a French army active during the Franco-Prussian war
 Eastern Army (Spain), also translated as the Army of the East; active during the Spanish Civil War
 Armée d'Orient (disambiguation), a number of historic units in the French army